HMS Nereide was a modified Black Swan-class sloop of the Royal Navy. She was laid down by Chatham Dockyard, Kent on 15 February 1943, launched on 29 January 1944 and commissioned on 3 May 1946, with the pennant number U64.

Construction and career
Commissioned in 1946, HMS Nereide therefore did not experience the fighting of the Second World War.

She was placed on the destruction list for demolition, Nereide arrived at the demolition site on 18 May 1958.

References

Further reading 
 
 
 
 
 

 

Black Swan-class sloops
Sloops of the United Kingdom
1944 ships